Dar Młodzieży is a Polish sail training ship designed by Zygmunt Choreń. A prototype of a class of six, the following five slightly-differing units were built subsequently by the same shipyard for the merchant fleet of the former Soviet Union. Her sister ships are Mir, Druzhba, Pallada, Khersones and Nadezhda.

The ship was launched in November 1981 at the Gdańsk Shipyard, Poland, and commissioned for service in July 1982 at Gdynia, thus replacing her forerunner Dar Pomorza. Her home port is Gdynia. The Dar Młodzieży is the first Polish-built, ocean-going sailing vessel to circumnavigate the globe (1987–88), thus repeating the famous voyage of her predecessor (1934–35).

Images

See also

List of large sailing vessels

References

http://www.am.gdynia.pl/en/

Individual sailing vessels
Sail training ships
Tall ships of Poland
1981 ships
Full-rigged ships
Ships built in Gdańsk